The following radio stations broadcast on FM frequency 92.4 MHz:

China 
 CNR Music Radio in Yongzhou
 CNR The Voice of China in Nanchong

Germany
 shared frequency of non-commercial radio stations in Munich, Bavaria

Japan
Radio Nippon at Yokohama

Morocco
Radio Plus Agadir at Agadir

Singapore
Symphony 924

References

Lists of radio stations by frequency